Banisteriopsis caapi, also known as, caapi, soul vine, or yagé (yage), is a South American liana of the family Malpighiaceae. It is commonly used as an ingredient of ayahuasca, a decoction with a long history of its entheogenic (connecting to spirit) use and its status as a "plant teacher" among the Indigenous peoples of the Amazon rainforest.

According to The CRC World Dictionary of Plant Names by Umberto Quattrocchi, the naming of the genus Banisteriopsis was dedicated to John Banister, a 17th-century English clergyman and naturalist. An earlier name for the genus was Banisteria and the plant is sometimes referred to as Banisteria caapi. Other names include Banisteria quitensis, Banisteriopsis inebrians, and Banisteriopsis quitensis.

Description
Caapi is a giant vine with characteristic  white or pale pink flowers which most commonly appear in January, but are known to bloom infrequently. It resembles Banisteriopsis membranifolia and Banisteriopsis muricata, both of which are related to caapi.

Phytochemicals

Alkaloids
Caapi contains the following harmala alkaloids:

Harmine, 0.31–8.43%
Harmaline, 0.03–0.83%
Tetrahydroharmine, 0.05–2.94%

These alkaloids of the beta-carboline class act as monoamine oxidase inhibitor (MAOIs). The MAOIs allow the primary psychoactive compound, DMT, which is introduced from the other common ingredient in ayahuasca Psychotria viridis, to be orally active.

The stems contain 0.11–0.83% beta-carbolines, with harmine and tetrahydroharmine as the major components.

Alkaloids are present in all parts of the plant.

Polyphenols 
In addition to beta-carbolines, caapi is known to contain proanthocyanidins, epicatechin and procyanidin B2, which have antioxidant properties.

Pharmacology

Neurogenesis

Several studies have shown the alkaloids in the B. caapi vine promote neurogenesis. More specifically, in vitro studies showed that harmine, tetrahydroharmine and harmaline, stimulated neural stem cell proliferation, migration, and differentiation into adult neurons. In vivo studies conducted on the dentate gyrus of the hippocampus noted an increase in the proliferation of BrdU positive cells in response to 100 μg of 5-MeO-DMT injected intravenously in the adult mouse brain.

History
First mention of caapi comes from early Spanish and Portuguese explorers and missionaries who visited South America in the 16th century, describing ayahuasca brews as “diabolic” and dangerous decoctions.

Although utilised among the indigenous tribes of South America for hundreds and perhaps even thousands of years, caapi was not identified by westerners until 1851, when Richard Spruce, an English botanist, described it as a new species. He observed how Guahibos,
the indigenous people of Llanos (Venezuela), chewed the bark of caapi instead of brewing it as a drink.

Legal issues

Legality
In the United States, caapi is not specifically regulated. A 2006 Supreme Court decision involving caapi-containing ayahuasca, which also contains other plants containing the controlled substance DMT, introduced from the Psychotria viridis component, Gonzales v. O Centro Espirita Beneficente Uniao do Vegetal, was found in favor of the União do Vegetal, a Brazilian religious sect using the tea in their ceremonies and having around 130 members in the United States.

In Australia, the harmala alkaloids are scheduled substances, including harmine and harmaline; however, the living vine, or other source plants are not scheduled in most states. In the State of Queensland as of March 2008, this distinction is now uncertain.  In all states, the dried herb may or may not be considered a scheduled substance, dependent on court rulings.

In Canada, harmala is listed under the Controlled Drugs and Substances Act as a schedule III substance. The vine and the ayahuasca brew are legal ambiguities, since nowhere in the Controlled Drugs and Substances Act is it stated that natural material containing a scheduled substance is illegal, a position supported by the United Nations International Narcotics Control Board.

Caapi, as well as a range of harmala alkaloids, were recently scheduled in France, following a court victory by the Santo Daime religious sect allowing use of the tea due to it not being a chemical extraction and the fact that the plants used were not scheduled. Religious exceptions to narcotics laws are not allowed under French law, effectively making any use or possession of the tea illegal.

Patent issues
The caapi vine itself was the subject of a dispute between U.S. entrepreneur Loren Miller and the Coordinating Body of Indigenous Organizations of the Amazon Basin (COICA). In 1986, Miller obtained a U.S. patent on a variety of B. caapi. COICA argued the patent was invalid because Miller's variety had been previously described in the University of Michigan Herbarium, and was therefore neither new nor distinct. The patent was overturned in 1999; however, in 2001, the United States Patent Office reinstated the patent because the law at the time the patent was granted did not allow a third party such as COICA standing to object. The Miller patent expired in 2003. B. caapi is now being cultivated commercially in Hawaii.

See also

Ayahuasca
Entheogen
List of psychoactive plants
Ethnobotany

References

Further reading

External links
 Banisteriopsis caapi List of Chemicals (Dr. Duke's Databases)
 Report on indigenous use of the plant, and the patent dispute 
 United States Patent # PP5,751,  Miller,  June 17, 1986, Banisteriopsis caapi (cv) `Da Vine`
 Erowid's Vault article on the plant
 A General Introduction to Ayahuasca

Ayahuasca
Entheogens
Flora of Ecuador
Flora of Peru
Herbal and fungal hallucinogens
Malpighiaceae
Monoamine oxidase inhibitors
Medicinal plants of South America
Plants described in 1858